The 2022–23 Slovenian Football Cup is the 32nd edition of the football knockout competition in Slovenia. The tournament began in August 2022 and will end in May 2023 with the final. This is the first edition of the cup tournament in a new format, where a total of 120 teams will participate in the first round.

Koper are the defending champions after winning their fourth cup title the previous season. The winners will earn a place in the second qualifying round of the 2023–24 UEFA Europa Conference League.

Preliminary round
Key: (1) = Slovenian PrvaLiga; (2) = Slovenian Second League; (3) = Slovenian Third League; (4, 5 and 6) = Slovenian Regional Leagues or Intercommunal Leagues (MNZ)

The preliminary round was organised and played within the framework of nine Intercommunal Football Associations (MNZ).

MNZ Celje

MNZ Gorenjske Kranj
Tržič 2012, Triglav Kranj, Železniki, Škofja Loka and Jesenice received a bye to the first round.

MNZ Koper

MNZ Lendava

MNZ Ljubljana

MNZ Maribor

MNZ Murska Sobota

MNZ Nova Gorica

MNZ Ptuj

First round
A total of 120 teams competed in the first round. All teams from the 2022–23 Slovenian PrvaLiga, which did not compete in European competitions, entered in this stage.

MNZ Celje

MNZ Gorenjske Kranj

MNZ Koper

MNZ Lendava

MNZ Ljubljana

MNZ Maribor

MNZ Murska Sobota

MNZ Nova Gorica

MNZ Ptuj

Second round

64 teams competed in the second round, including 60 winners of the first round and 4 teams that represented Slovenia in European competitions.

MNZ Celje

MNZ Gorenjske Kranj

MNZ Koper

MNZ Lendava

MNZ Ljubljana

MNZ Maribor

MNZ Murska Sobota

MNZ Nova Gorica

MNZ Ptuj

Round of 32
The draw for the round of 32 was held on 21 October 2022. The matches were played on 8, 9 and 10 November.

Round of 16
The draw for the round of 16 was held on 23 November 2022. The matches were played on 7, 8 and 9 March 2023.

Quarter-finals
The draw for the quarter-finals was held on 14 March 2023. The matches will be played on 5 and 6 April.

See also
 2022–23 Slovenian PrvaLiga

References

Slovenian Football Cup seasons
Cup
Slovenia